This is a list of Ecuadorian dishes and foods. Ecuadorian cuisine, the cuisine of Ecuador, is diverse, varying with altitude, agricultural conditions, and the ethnic and racial makeup of local communities. On the coast, a variety of seafood, grilled steak and chicken are served along with fried plantain, rice and beans. Stewed beef and goat are traditional too. The most traditional seafood dishes are ceviche (shrimp, mussels, oysters, fish, and others) and fish soup. Also, there are a variety of soups based on local vegetables, like sopa de queso (vegetables and white cheese) and caldo de bolas, a soup based on plantains.

In the mountains, pork, chicken, beef, and cuy (guinea pig) are served with a variety of carbohydrate-rich foods, especially rice, corn, and potatoes. A popular street food in mountainous regions is hornado (roasted pig), which is often served with llapingacho (a pan-seared potato ball). Some examples of Ecuadorian cuisine in general include patacones (unripe plantains fried in oil, mashed up, and then refried), llapingachos, and seco de chivo (a type of stew made from goat). A wide variety of fresh fruit is available, particularly at lower altitudes, including granadilla, passionfruit, naranjilla, several types of bananas, uvilla, taxo, and tree tomato, along with a drink made from fruits known as the colada or even the colada morada.

Ecuadorian dishes and foods

  Alfajor
  Arroz con menestra (rice with a kidney bean stew— often served with fried beef & plantains)
  Arroz con pollo
  Ceviche
  Chifle
  Chugchucaras – a local delicacy of Latacunga, Ecuador, and the surrounding area prepared with deep fried pork and several other ingredients
  Churrasco
  Churro
  Chuzos "Carne en palito" (beef skewers) 
  Dulce de Leche
  Come y Bebe (a tropical fruit salad served in orange juice)
  Ecuador maize varieties – Maize is cropped almost everywhere in Ecuador, with the exception of the Altiplano, the cold desert highlands 3000 meters above sea level.
  Empanadas de Platano
  Empanadas de Viento
  Encebollado – a fish stew from Ecuador, regarded as a national dish.
  Ensalada de veteraba (beet salad)
  Escabeche
  Fanesca
  Fritada
  Guatitas
  Guinea pig
  Hornado
  Humita
  Ilex guayusa
  Llapingacho
  Locro
  Morocho - a hominy-based breakfast porridge 
  Mote
  Panela – unrefined whole cane sugar
  Pescado frito (fried fish—typically served with rice, curtido de cebolla y tomate, and patacones)
  Patacones
  Plantain soup – Caldo de bolas de verde (green plantain dumpling soup) is from coastal Ecuador
  Roscas
  Sancocho
  Sanduche de pernil (roasted pork sandwich) 
  Sango de Camarones
  Sango de Platano Verde
  Salchipapas
  Seco
  Refrito – referred to as refrito in Ecuador, and it is made of Spanish onions, cubanelle peppers, fresh tomatoes, roasted garlic, cilantro and ground toasted cumin
  Lechon (Suckling pig)
Bolón de verde
  T'anta wawa
  Tamale 
  Tortilla de verde
  Uchu Jacu
 Yawarlukru

Condiments
 Salprieta
 Ají Criollo
  Curtido de cebolla y tomate - a pickled onion & tomato salsa

Beverages

 Canelazo – a hot alcoholic beverage consumed in the Andean highlands of Ecuador, Colombia, and Peru
 Champús
 Chapil
 Chicha
 Colada morada
 Cuáker – a breakfast beverage made with Quaker Oats. Cuáker is a loanword of Quaker. 
 Fioravanti – a fruit-flavored, carbonated soft drink first sold in 1878 in Ecuador
 Horchata

See also

 Amazonian cuisine
 Latin American cuisine
 Outline of Ecuador

References

Lists of foods by nationality
Dishes And Foods